Helen Walker-Hill (née Siemens; May 26, 1936 – August 8, 2013) was a Canadian pianist and musicologist who specialised in the music of black women composers.

Walker-Hill was married to the composer George Walker from 1960 to 1975. The marriage produced two sons, the violinist and composer Gregory T.S. Walker and the playwright Ian Walker. From 1981 to 1991 she was married to Robert Hadley Hill, a Colorado teacher.

Biography 
Helen Walker-Hill was born on May 26, 1936, in Winnipeg, Manitoba, Canada. She received her early musical training from her mother, Margaret Siemens, and continued piano studies with Emma Endres Kountz in Toledo, Ohio. She received her BA degree from the University of Toledo (1957), and was a Fulbright fellow at the Ecole Normale de Musique de Paris in France where she studied with Nadia Boulanger (1958); on the ship she met George Walker. She earned an MA in musicology from Smith College (1965) and a DMA in piano performance from the University of Colorado (1981), where from 1983 to 1990 she was assistant professor adjunct on the piano faculty. From 1993 to 1998 she was visiting assistant professor at the University of Wyoming. She also taught at Muhlenberg College.

From 1987 on, wanting to use music of black women composers in her piano performance and teaching, Walker-Hill dedicated herself to uncovering the material. She utilized secondary sources and numerous archives, conducted interviews with composers, and engaged in voluminous correspondence with individuals and institutions. She was awarded a 1995–96 Scholar-in-Residence Fellowship at the Schomburg Center for Research in Black Culture in New York City. In 1996–1997 Walker-Hill was a Rockefeller resident fellow in the humanities at the Center for Black Music Research (CBMR), Columbia College.

Her lecture "Rediscovering Heritage: The Music of Black Women Composers" was widely published and was featured on National Public Radio. She compiled and edited the anthology Black Women Composers: A century of piano music, 1893-1990 (1992); the unprecedented volume contains scores and biographical information for Estelle D. Ricketts, Anna Gardner Goodwin, L. Viola Kinney, Amanda Aldridge (pseud. Montague Ring), Florence B. Price, Mary Lou Williams, Julia Perry, Undine Smith Moore, Betty Jackson King, Philippa Duke Schuyler, Tania León, Margaret Bonds, Lena Johnson McLin, Valerie Capers, Regina A. Harris Baiocchi, Dorothy Rudd Moore, Joyce Solomon, Mable Bailey, and Zenobia Powell Perry. 

In 1995, the CBMR published Walker-Hill’s Piano Music by Black Women Composers: A Catalog of Solo and Ensemble Works. She and her son Gregory Walker recorded the CD Kaleidoscope: Music of Black American Women (1995). She continued traveling throughout the United States to locate and interview composers. She edited the Vivace Press series Music by African American Women, and published four volumes of music—pieces by Rachel Eubanks (two vols., Vivace, 1995, and Hildegard, 2003), by Nora Holt (Vivace, 2001), and by Irene Britton Smith (Vivace, 2001). In 2002, she published her landmark study From Spirituals to Symphonies: African-American Women Composers and Their Music which includes some previously unknown names along with the more familiar. 

She donated the bulk of her collection of taped interviews with composers, scores, photos, and other research materials to the CBMR Library and Archives as the Helen Walker-Hill Collection.  In 2005 the CBMR received a $94,000 grant from the National Endowment for the Humanities to compile a detailed finding aid to the Helen Walker-Hill Collection as part of a project to inventory the papers of three major women scholars: Eileen Southern, Dena J. Epstein, and Helen Walker-Hill. In 2006, Walker-Hill consulted with the CBMR on the production of a concert of piano, vocal, and chamber works from her collection. The American Music Research Center at the University of Colorado Boulder also holds materials and organizes performances of the music.

Works

Books 
 Piano Music by Black Women Composers: A Catalog of Solo and Ensemble Works: Greenwood Press, 1992
 Black Women Composers: A Century of Piano Music 1983-1990, with Montague Ring: Hildegard Publishing Co., 1992 
 Music by Black Women Composers: A Biography of Available Scores; CBMR Monographs, 1995 
 From Spirituals to Symphonies: African-American Women Composers and Their Music: Greenwood Press, 2002

Recordings 
 Kaleidoscope: Music by African-American Women with Gregory Walker (Leonarda LE 339, 1995)

References

External links 
 "Rediscovering Heritage: The Music of Black Women Composers"
 "Guide to the Helen Walker-Hill Collection" University of Colorado, Boulder

1936 births
2013 deaths
University of Toledo alumni
Smith College alumni
University of Colorado alumni
University of Colorado Boulder faculty
University of Wyoming faculty
Muhlenberg College faculty